Korani-ye Sofla (also Romanized as Korānī-ye Soflá, Korānī-e Soflá, and Korrānī-ye Soflá; also known as Korānī-ye Pā'īn and Korrāni) is a village in Dorudfaraman Rural District, in the Central District of Kermanshah County, Kermanshah Province, Iran. At the 2006 census, its population was 535, in 129 families.

References 

Populated places in Kermanshah County